In mathematics, a Hodge structure, named after W. V. D. Hodge, is an algebraic structure at the level of linear algebra, similar to the one that Hodge theory gives to the cohomology groups of a smooth and compact Kähler manifold. Hodge structures have been generalized for all complex varieties (even if they are singular and non-complete) in the form of mixed Hodge structures, defined by Pierre Deligne (1970). A variation of Hodge structure is a family of Hodge structures parameterized by a manifold, first studied by Phillip Griffiths (1968). All these concepts were further generalized to mixed Hodge modules over complex varieties by Morihiko Saito (1989).

Hodge structures

Definition of Hodge structures

An equivalent definition is obtained by replacing the direct sum decomposition of H by the Hodge filtration, a finite decreasing filtration of H by complex subspaces  subject to the condition

The relation between these two descriptions is given as follows:

For example, if X is a compact Kähler manifold,  is the n-th cohomology group of X with integer coefficients, then  is its n-th cohomology group with complex coefficients and Hodge theory provides the decomposition of H into a direct sum  as above, so that these data define a pure Hodge structure of weight n.

Using the Riemann bilinear relations, in this case called Hodge Riemann bilinear relations, it can be substantially simplified.

In terms of the Hodge filtration, these conditions imply that

Yet another definition of a Hodge structure is based on the equivalence between the -grading on a complex vector space and the action of the circle group U(1). In this definition, an action of the multiplicative group of complex numbers  viewed as a two-dimensional real algebraic  torus, is given on H. This action must have the property that a real number a acts by an. The subspace  is the subspace on which  acts as multiplication by

A-Hodge structure
In the theory of motives, it becomes important to allow more general coefficients for the cohomology. Then a pure Hodge A-structure of weight n is defined as before, replacing  with A. There are natural functors of base change and restriction relating Hodge A-structures and B-structures for A a subring of B.

Mixed Hodge structures

It was noticed by Jean-Pierre Serre in the 1960s based on the Weil conjectures that even singular (possibly reducible) and non-complete algebraic varieties should admit 'virtual Betti numbers'. More precisely, one should be able to assign to any algebraic variety X a polynomial PX(t), called its virtual Poincaré polynomial, with the properties
 If X is nonsingular and projective (or complete) 
 If Y is closed algebraic subset of X and U = X \ Y 
The existence of such polynomials would follow from the existence of an analogue of Hodge structure in the cohomologies of a general (singular and non-complete) algebraic variety. The novel feature is that the nth cohomology of a general variety looks as if it contained pieces of different weights. This led Alexander Grothendieck to his conjectural theory of motives and motivated a search for an extension of Hodge theory, which culminated in the work of Pierre Deligne. He introduced the notion of a mixed Hodge structure, developed techniques for working with them, gave their construction (based on Heisuke Hironaka's resolution of singularities) and related them to the weights on l-adic cohomology, proving the last part of the Weil conjectures.

Example of curves 
Further, assume that the components are not compact, but can be compactified by adding the points . The first cohomology group of the curve X (with compact support) is dual to the first homology group, which is easier to visualize. There are three types of one-cycles in this group. First, there are elements  representing small loops around the punctures . Then there are elements  that are coming from the first homology of the compactification of each of the components. This suggests that  admits an increasing filtration

 

whose successive quotients Wn/Wn−1 originate from the cohomology of smooth complete varieties, hence admit (pure) Hodge structures, albeit of different weights. Further examples can be found in "A Naive Guide to Mixed Hodge Theory".

Definition of mixed Hodge structure 
Here the induced filtration on

 

is defined by

 

One can define a notion of a morphism of mixed Hodge structures, which has to be compatible with the filtrations F and W and prove the following:

Theorem. Mixed Hodge structures form an abelian category. The kernels and cokernels in this category coincide with the usual kernels and cokernels in the category of vector spaces, with the induced filtrations.

The total cohomology of a compact Kähler manifold has a mixed Hodge structure, where the nth space of the weight filtration Wn is the direct sum of the cohomology groups (with rational coefficients) of degree less than or equal to n. Therefore, one can think of classical Hodge theory in the compact, complex case as providing a double grading on the complex cohomology group, which defines an increasing filtration Fp and a decreasing filtration Wn that are compatible in certain way. In general, the total cohomology space still has these two filtrations, but they no longer come from a direct sum decomposition. In relation with the third definition of the pure Hodge structure, one can say that a mixed Hodge structure cannot be described using the action of the group  An important insight of Deligne is that in the mixed case there is a more complicated noncommutative proalgebraic group that can be used to the same effect using Tannakian formalism.

Moreover, the category of (mixed) Hodge structures admits a good notion of tensor product, corresponding to the product of varieties, as well as related concepts of inner Hom and dual object, making it into a Tannakian category.

Mixed Hodge structure in cohomology (Deligne's theorem) 
Deligne has proved that the nth cohomology group of an arbitrary algebraic variety has a canonical mixed Hodge structure. This structure is functorial, and compatible with the products of varieties (Künneth isomorphism) and the product in cohomology. For a complete nonsingular variety X this structure is pure of weight n, and the Hodge filtration can be defined through the hypercohomology of the truncated de Rham complex.

The proof roughly consists of two parts, taking care of noncompactness and singularities. Both parts use the resolution of singularities (due to Hironaka) in an essential way. In the singular case, varieties are replaced by simplicial schemes, leading to more complicated homological algebra, and a technical notion of a Hodge structure on complexes (as opposed to cohomology) is used.

Using the theory of motives, it is possible to refine the weight filtration on the cohomology with rational coefficients to one with integral coefficients.

Examples
More generally, its nth tensor power is denoted by  it is 1-dimensional and pure of weight −2n.
The cohomology of a compact Kähler manifold has a Hodge structure, and the nth cohomology group is pure of weight n.
The cohomology of a complex variety (possibly singular or non-proper) has a mixed Hodge structure.
For a projective variety  with normal crossing singularities there is a spectral sequence with a degenerate E2-page which computes all of its mixed Hodge structures. The E1-page has explicit terms with a differential coming from a simplicial set.
Any smooth variety X admits a smooth compactification with complement a normal crossing divisor. The corresponding logarithmic forms can be used to describe the mixed Hodge structure on the cohomology of X explicitly.
The Hodge structure for a smooth projective hypersurface  of degree  was worked out explicitly by Griffiths in his "Period Integrals of Algebraic Manifolds" paper. There is an extra vector in  given by the Lefschetz class . Hence the Hodge diamond reads 
 We can also use the previous isomorphism to verify the genus of a degree  plane curve. Since  is a smooth curve and the Ehresmann fibration theorem guarantees that every other smooth curve of genus  is diffeomorphic, we have that the genus then the same.
 The Hodge numbers for a complete intersection are also readily computable: there is a combinatorial formula found by Friedrich Hirzebruch.

Applications 
The machinery based on the notions of Hodge structure and mixed Hodge structure forms a part of still largely conjectural theory of motives envisaged by Alexander Grothendieck. Arithmetic information for nonsingular algebraic variety X, encoded by eigenvalue of Frobenius elements acting on its l-adic cohomology,  has something in common with the Hodge structure arising from X considered as a complex algebraic variety. Sergei Gelfand and Yuri Manin remarked around 1988 in their Methods of homological algebra, that unlike Galois symmetries acting on other cohomology groups, the origin of "Hodge symmetries" is very mysterious, although formally, they are expressed through the action of the fairly uncomplicated group  on the de Rham cohomology. Since then, the mystery has deepened with the discovery and mathematical formulation of mirror symmetry.

Variation of Hodge structure
A variation of Hodge structure is a family of Hodge structures
parameterized by a complex manifold X. More precisely a variation of Hodge structure of weight n on a complex manifold X consists of a locally constant sheaf S of finitely generated abelian groups on X, together with a decreasing Hodge filtration F on S ⊗ OX, subject to the following two conditions:
The filtration induces a Hodge structure of weight n on each stalk of the sheaf S
(Griffiths transversality) The natural connection on S ⊗ OX maps  into 

A variation of mixed Hodge structure can be defined in a similar way, by adding a grading or filtration W to S. Typical examples can be found from algebraic morphisms . For example,

has fibers

give variations of mixed hodge structures.

Hodge modules

Hodge modules are a generalization of variation of Hodge structures on a complex manifold. They can be thought of informally as something like sheaves of Hodge structures on a manifold; the precise definition  is rather technical and complicated.  There are generalizations to mixed Hodge modules, and to manifolds with singularities.

For each smooth complex variety, there is an abelian category of mixed Hodge modules associated with it. These behave formally like the categories of sheaves over the manifolds; for example, morphisms f between manifolds induce functors f∗, f*, f!, f! between (derived categories of) mixed Hodge modules similar to the ones for sheaves.

See also 
 Mixed Hodge structure
 Hodge conjecture
Jacobian ideal
 Hodge–Tate structure, a p-adic analogue of Hodge structures.

Notes

Introductory references

 (Gives tools for computing hodge numbers using sheaf cohomology)
A Naive Guide to Mixed Hodge Theory
 (Gives a formula and generators for mixed Hodge numbers of affine Milnor fiber of a weighted homogenous polynomial, and also a formula for complements of weighted homogeneous polynomials in a weighted projective space.)

Survey articles

References

 This constructs a mixed Hodge structure on the cohomology of a complex variety.
 This constructs a mixed Hodge structure on the cohomology of a complex variety.
 This constructs a mixed Hodge structure on the cohomology of a complex variety.

.  An annotated version of this article can be found on J. Milne's homepage.

Homological algebra
Hodge theory
Structures on manifolds